is a private junior college in Hiroshima, Hiroshima, Japan. The school first opened as a women's junior college in 1964. In 1999 it became coeducational.

External links
 Official website 

Japanese junior colleges
Educational institutions established in 1964
Private universities and colleges in Japan
Universities and colleges in Hiroshima Prefecture
1964 establishments in Japan